Dancing at the Blue Lagoon is the second studio album by American indie pop band Cayucas. It was released in June 2015 under Secretly Canadian.

Track listing

References

2015 albums